John McCall was a Scottish footballer during the late 1950s. Following a brief spell with Gloucester City he signed up with Dumbarton in the summer of 1954. Here he played with distinction, being a constant in the Dumbarton team for over four seasons.

References 

Scottish footballers
Dumbarton F.C. players
Scottish Football League players
Possibly living people
Association football wing halves
Date of birth missing